Ricker is a surname. Notable people with the surname include:

Ariel Ricker (contemporary) founder of Advocates Abroad
Bill Ricker (1908–2001), one of the founders of fisheries science. 
Bob Ricker (contemporary), Executive Director of the American Hunters and Shooters Association
Maëlle Ricker (b. 1978), Canadian athlete, 2006 & 2010 Winter Olympics contestant
Nathan Clifford Ricker (1843–1924), American professor and architect
John Clayton Ricker (1973-2018), American Professor and Lawyer
 Johnny Ricker Greyhound Bus Driver

See also
Ricker Bay, Wisconsin
CCGS W. E. Ricker, Canadian Coast Guard offshore fisheries research vessel
Ricker College, former college (1848–1978) in Houlton, Maine, USA
Ricker model, statistical population model